Joemy Wilson is a hammered dulcimer player from New Haven, Connecticut.  Her first instruments were the piano and violin.  She also took voice lessons in high school.  She started playing Appalachian dulcimer while attending Barnard College, and started playing hammered dulcimer in 1979.

Wilson has made several recordings on the Dargason label, and is particularly noted for her recordings of the compositions of Irish harper Turlough O'Carolan.  She has collaborated with several artists, including Miamon Miller, Valarie King, Scott Fraser, Anisa Angarola, and Sylvia Woods.

Early life
Joemy graduated Barnard College.

Discography 
Carolan's Cup: Music of Turlough O'Carolan Volume I (1984)
Gifts: Traditional Christmas Carols (1985)
Gifts II: Traditional Christmas Carols (1987)
Gifts III: Christmas Music From Around The World (1997)
Carolan's Cottage: Music of Turlough O'Carolan Volume II (1986)
Beatles on Hammered Dulcimer (1989)
Celtic Dreams: Music of Turlough O'Carolan Volume III (1989)
Dulcimer Lullabies (1991)
Celtic Treasures: Music of Ireland Volume IV (1994)

References

External links
Joemy Wilson at www.answers.com

Living people
Year of birth missing (living people)
American folk musicians
American multi-instrumentalists
Barnard College alumni
Hammered dulcimer players
Musicians from New Haven, Connecticut